Les Gilbert (born 10 January 1946 in Melbourne, Australia) is an Australian musician who was a founding member of the 1960s band, Wild Cherries. He appeared on their early recordings, which, together with the band's four singles for Festival, have been picked up for a compilation album by the Half a Cow record company.

In 1990, Gilbert released a "Natural Symphony" CD titled Kakadu Billiabong which is an unedited, high quality recording of dawn at a billabong on Nourlangie Creek in Kakadu National Park in Northern Territory. There is no music overdub and the birds and other animals can be heard going about their usual morning routine.

References

General
  Note: Archived [on-line] copy has limited functionality.
  Note: [on-line] version established at White Room Electronic Publishing Pty Ltd in 2007 and was expanded from the 2002 edition.

Specific

1946 births
Living people
Australian keyboardists
Wild Cherries members